Labyrinthidae is a family of air-breathing land snails, terrestrial pulmonate gastropod mollusks in the superfamily Helicoidea.

Genera
 Isomeria Albers, 1850
 Labyrinthus H. Beck, 1837
Genera brought into synonymy
 Ambages Gude, 1912 : synonym of Labyrinthus H. Beck, 1837 (junior synonym)
 Lampadion Röding, 1798 : synonym of Labyrinthus H. Beck, 1837
 Lyrostoma Swainson, 1840 : synonym of Labyrinthus H. Beck, 1837

References

External links
 Sei M., Robinson D.G., Geneva A.J. & Rosenberg G. (2017). Doubled helix: Sagdoidea is the overlooked sister group of Helicoidea (Mollusca: Gastropoda: Pulmonata). Biological Journal of the Linnean Society. 122(4): 697-728

Helicoidea